Daravaram is a village in Chagallu mandalam, East Godavari district in Andhra Pradesh state in India.

Geography
Daravaram is a village in Chagallu mandalam, East Godavari district, Andhra Pradesh, India. The village came into East Godavari district after the redrawing of district borders by Jagan reddy government.

Demographics 

 Census of India, Daravaram had a population of 2514. The total population constitute, 1250 males and 1264 females with a sex ratio of 1011 females per 1000 males. 262 children are in the age group of 0–6 years, with sex ratio of 1031. The average literacy rate stands at 69.76%.

References

Villages in West Godavari district